Johan de Preter (born 19 April 1962) is a Belgian former professional tennis player.

Active in the 1980s, de Preter is a native of Mechelen and played two years of collegiate tennis for the University of Louisiana. His professional career included an occasional ATP Challenger main draw appearance and he reached a best singles world ranking of 453. He appeared for the Belgium Davis Cup team in a 1987 tie against Switzerland in Lugano, then in 1991 and 1992 served as the team's non-playing captain.

See also
List of Belgium Davis Cup team representatives

References

External links
 
 
 

1962 births
Living people
Belgian male tennis players
Louisiana Ragin' Cajuns men's tennis players
Sportspeople from Mechelen